Learn to Play Guitar is a 1997 EP by Gigolo Aunts.  It includes the track "Kinda Girl", co-written by Jules Shear.  The album cover features Anna Lucas.

Track listing
US Version (Wicked Disc) Catalog Number: WIC 1007-2 (1997)

"Kinda Girl"  (Jules Shear/Gibbs/Hurley)  3:18
"Wishing You the Worst"  (Gibbs/Hurley)  2:52
"Sway"  (Gibbs/Hurley)  4:38
"Sloe"  (Gibbs/Hurley)  3:26
"Rocking Chair"  (Gibbs/Hurley)  3:39
"The Sun Will Rise Again"  (Gibbs/Hurley)  3:26

References

1997 EPs
Gigolo Aunts albums